The Republic of China (ROC), between 1912 and 1949, was a sovereign state recognised as the official designation of China when it was based on Mainland China, prior to the relocation of its central government to Taiwan as a result of the Chinese Civil War. At a population of 541 million in 1949, it was the world's most populous country. Covering , it consisted of 35 provinces, 1 special administrative region, 2 regions, 12 special municipalities, 14 leagues, and 4 special banners. The People's Republic of China (PRC), which rules mainland China today, considers ROC as a country that ceased to exist since 1949; thus, the history of ROC before 1949 is often referred to as Republican Era of China. The ROC, now based in Taiwan, today considers itself a continuation of the country, thus referring to the period of its mainland governance as the Mainland Period of the Republic of China in Taiwan.

The Republic was declared on 1 January 1912 after the Xinhai Revolution, which overthrew the Manchu-led Qing dynasty, the last imperial dynasty of China. On 12 February 1912, regent Empress Dowager Longyu signed the abdication decree on behalf of the Xuantong Emperor, ending several millennia of Chinese monarchical rule. Sun Yat-sen, the founder and its provisional president, served only briefly before handing over the presidency to Yuan Shikai, the leader of the Beiyang Army. Sun's party, the Kuomintang (KMT), then led by Song Jiaoren, won the parliamentary election held in December 1912. However, Song was assassinated on Yuan's orders shortly after and the Beiyang Army, led by Yuan, maintained full control of the Beiyang government, who then proclaimed the Empire of China in 1915 before abolishing the short-lived monarchy as a result of popular unrest. After Yuan's death in 1916, the authority of the Beiyang government was further weakened by a brief restoration of the Qing dynasty. The mostly powerless government led to a fracturing of the country as cliques in the Beiyang Army claimed individual autonomy and clashed with each other. So began the Warlord Era: a decade of decentralized power struggles and prolonged armed conflict.

The KMT, under the leadership of Sun, attempted multiple times to establish a national government in Canton. After taking Canton for a third time in 1923, the KMT successfully established a rival government in preparation for a campaign to unify China. In 1924 the KMT would enter into an alliance with the fledgling Chinese Communist Party (CCP) as a requirement for Soviet support. General Chiang Kai-shek, who became the Chairman of the Kuomintang after Sun's death and subsequent power struggle in 1925, began the Northern Expedition in 1926 to overthrow the Beiyang government. In 1927, Chiang moved the nationalist government to Nanking and purged the CCP, beginning with the Shanghai massacre. The latter event forced the CCP and KMT's left-wing into armed rebellion, marking the beginning of the Chinese Civil War and the establishment of a rival nationalist government in Wuhan under Wang Jingwei. However, this rival government soon purged the communists as well and reconciled with Chiang's KMT. After the Northern Expedition resulted in nominal unification under Chiang in 1928, disgruntled warlords formed an anti-Chiang coalition. These warlords would fight Chiang and his allies in the Central Plains War from 1929 to 1930, ultimately losing in the largest conflict of the Warlord Era.

China experienced some industrialization during the 1930s but suffered setbacks from conflicts between the Nationalist government in Nanjing, the CCP, remaining warlords, and the Empire of Japan after the Japanese invasion of Manchuria. Nation-building efforts yielded to fight the Second Sino-Japanese War in 1937 when a skirmish between the National Revolutionary Army and Imperial Japanese Army culminated in a full-scale invasion by Japan. Hostilities between the KMT and CCP partially subsided when, shortly before the war, they formed the Second United Front to resist Japanese aggression until the alliance broke down in 1941. The war lasted until the surrender of Japan at the end of World War II in 1945; China then regained control of the island of Taiwan and the Pescadores.

Shortly after, the Chinese Civil War between the KMT and CCP resumed with full-scale fighting, leading to the 1946 Constitution of the Republic of China replacing the 1928 Organic Law as the Republic's fundamental law. Three years later, in 1949, nearing the end of the civil war, the CCP established the People's Republic of China in Beijing, with the KMT-led ROC moving its capital several times from Nanjing to Guangzhou, followed by Chongqing, then Chengdu and lastly, Taipei. The CCP emerged victorious and expelled the KMT and ROC government from the Chinese mainland. The ROC later lost control of Hainan in 1950, and the Dachen Islands in Zhejiang in 1955. It has maintained control over Taiwan and other smaller islands.

The ROC was a founding member of the League of Nations and later the United Nations (including its Security Council seat) where it maintained until 1971, when the People's Republic of China took over its membership. It was also a member of the Universal Postal Union and the International Olympic Committee.

Names

During the mainland period, the country was known in English as "China" or the "Republic of China". Internally, Zhongguo, Zhonghua or Jung-hwa, or Minguo were used as short forms of the official country name Zhonghua Minguo  in Chinese. Both "Beiyang government" (from 1912 to 1928), and "Nationalist government" (from 1928 to 1949) used the name "Republic of China" as their official name.

Significance of the name 
The country's official Chinese name Chunghwa Minkuo, stemmed from the party manifesto of Tongmenghui in 1905, which says the four goals of the Chinese revolution was "to expel the Manchu rulers, to revive Chunghwa, to establish a Republic, and to distribute land equally among the people.()." The convener of Tongmenghui and Chinese revolutionary leader Sun Yat-sen proposed the name Chunghwa Minkuo as the assumed name of the new country when the revolution succeeded. After the Xinhai revolution overthrew the Qing dynasty in 1911–12, Sun further explained the meaning of the country's Chinese name in detail in 1916:

On 20 October 1923, Sun again stressed that Chunghwa Minkuo means a state "of the people."

Relevance in Taiwan politics 
Taiwanese politician Mei Feng criticised the official English name of the state "Republic of China" fails to translate the Chinese character "Min" according to Sun Yat-sen's original interpretations, while the name should instead be translated as "the People's Republic of China," which confuses with the current official name of mainland China under communist rule. To avoid confusion, the ROC government in Taiwan began to put an aside of "Taiwan" next to its official name since 2005.

History

Overview
A republic was formally established on 1 January 1912 following the Xinhai Revolution, which itself began with the Wuchang uprising on 10 October 1911, successfully overthrowing the Qing dynasty and ending over two thousand years of imperial rule in China. From its founding until 1949, the republic was based on mainland China. Central authority waxed and waned in response to warlordism (1915–28), a Japanese invasion (1937–45), and a full-scale civil war (1927–49), with central authority strongest during the Nanjing Decade (1927–37), when most of China came under the control of the authoritarian, one-party military dictatorship of the Kuomintang (KMT).

In 1945, at the end of World War II, the Empire of Japan surrendered control of Taiwan and its island groups to the Allies; and Taiwan was placed under the Republic of China's administrative control. The communist takeover of mainland China in 1949, after the Chinese Civil War, left the ruling Kuomintang with control over only Taiwan, Penghu, Kinmen, Matsu, and other minor islands. With the loss of the mainland, the ROC government retreated to Taiwan and the KMT declared Taipei the provisional capital. Meanwhile, the CCP took over all of mainland China and founded the People's Republic of China (PRC) in Beijing.

1912–1916: Founding

In 1912, after over two thousand years of imperial rule, a republic was established to replace the monarchy. The Qing dynasty that preceded the republic had experienced instability throughout the 19th century and suffered from both internal rebellion and foreign imperialism. A program of institutional reform proved too little and too late. Only the lack of an alternative regime prolonged the monarchy's existence until 1912.

The Chinese Republic grew out of the Wuchang Uprising against the Qing government, on 10 October 1911, which is now celebrated annually as the ROC's national day, also known as "Double Ten Day". Sun Yat-sen had been actively promoting revolution from his bases in exile. He then returned and on 29 December, Sun Yat-sen was elected president by the Nanjing assembly, which consisted of representatives from seventeen provinces. On 1 January 1912, he was officially inaugurated and pledged "to overthrow the despotic government led by the Manchu, consolidate the Republic of China and plan for the welfare of the people". Sun's new government lacked military strength. As a compromise, he negotiated with Yuan Shikai the commander of the Beiyang Army, promising Yuan the presidency of the republic if he were to remove the Qing emperor by force. Yuan agreed to the deal, and the last emperor of the Qing dynasty, Puyi, was forced to abdicate on 12 February. Song Jiaoren led the Kuomintang Party to electoral victories by fashioning his party's program to appeal to the gentry, landowners, and merchants. Song was assassinated on 20 March 1913, at the behest of Yuan Shikai.

Yuan was elected president of the ROC in 1913. He ruled by military power and ignored the republican institutions established by his predecessor, threatening to execute Senate members who disagreed with his decisions. He soon dissolved the ruling Kuomintang (KMT) party, banned "secret organizations" (which implicitly included the KMT), and ignored the provisional constitution. An attempt at a democratic election in 1912 ended with the assassination of the elected candidate by a man recruited by Yuan. Ultimately, Yuan declared himself Emperor of China in 1915. The new ruler of China tried to increase centralization by abolishing the provincial system; however, this move angered the gentry along with the provincial governors, who were usually military men.

1916–1927: Warlord Era

Yuan's changes to government caused many provinces to declare independence and become warlord states. Increasingly unpopular and deserted by his supporters, Yuan abdicated in 1916 and died of natural causes shortly thereafter. China then declined into a period of warlordism. Sun, having been forced into exile, returned to Guangdong in the south in 1917 and 1922, with the help of warlords, and set up successive rival governments to the Beiyang government in Beijing, having re-established the KMT in October 1919. Sun's dream was to unify China by launching an expedition against the north. However, he lacked the military support and funding to turn it into a reality.

Meanwhile, the Beiyang government struggled to hold onto power, and an open and wide-ranging debate evolved regarding how China should confront the West. In 1919, a student protest against the government's weak response to the Treaty of Versailles, considered unfair by Chinese intellectuals, led to the May Fourth movement, whose demonstrations were against the danger of spreading Western influence replacing Chinese culture. It was in this intellectual climate that the influence of Marxism spread and became popular, leading to the founding of the CCP in 1921.

After Sun's death in March 1925, Chiang Kai-shek became the leader of the Kuomintang. In 1926, Chiang led the Northern Expedition with the intention of defeating the Beiyang warlords and unifying the country. Chiang received the help of the Soviet Union and the CCP. However, he soon dismissed his Soviet advisers, being convinced that they wanted to get rid of the KMT and take control. Chiang decided to purge the Communists, killing thousands of them. At the same time, other violent conflicts were taking place in China: in the South, where the CCP had superior numbers, Nationalist supporters were being massacred. Such events eventually led to the Chinese Civil War between the Nationalists and Communists.

1927–1937: Nanjing decade

Chiang Kai-shek pushed the CCP into the interior and established a government, with Nanking as its capital, in 1927. By 1928, Chiang's army overthrew the Beiyang government and unified the entire nation, at least nominally, beginning the so-called Nanjing decade.

Sun Yat-sen envisioned three phases for the KMT rebuilding of Chinamilitary rule and violent reunification; political tutelage; and finally a constitutional democracy. In 1930, after seizing power and reunifying China by force, the "tutelage" phase started with the promulgation of a provisional constitution. Criticized for instituting authoritarianism, Chiang launched the New Life Movement to promote moral behavior and claimed the government was establishing a modern democratic society. Among other things, it created the Academia Sinica, the Central Bank of China, and other agencies. In 1932, China sent its first team to the Olympic Games. Campaigns were mounted and laws passed to promote the rights of women. Addressing social problems, especially in remote villages, was aided by improved communications. The Rural Reconstruction Movement was one of many that took advantage of the new freedom to raise social consciousness. The Nationalist government published a draft constitution on 5 May 1936.

Continual wars plagued the government. Those in the western border regions included the Kumul Rebellion, the Sino-Tibetan War, and the Soviet Invasion of Xinjiang. Large areas of China proper remained under the semi-autonomous rule of local warlords such as Feng Yuxiang and Yan Xishan, provincial military leaders, or warlord coalitions. Nationalist rule was strongest in the eastern regions around the capital Nanjing. The Central Plains War in 1930, the Japanese aggression in 1931, and the Red Army's Long March in 1934 led to more power for the central government, but there continued to be foot-dragging and even outright defiance, as in the Fujian Rebellion of 1933–34.

Reformers and critics pushed for democracy and human rights, but the task seemed difficult if not impossible. The nation was at war and divided between Communists and Nationalists. Corruption and lack of direction hindered reforms. Chiang told the State Council: "Our organization becomes worse and worse... many staff members just sit at their desks and gaze into space, others read newspapers and still others sleep."

1937–1945: Second Sino-Japanese War

Few Chinese had any illusions about Japanese desires on China. Hungry for raw materials and pressed by a growing population, Japan initiated the seizure of Manchuria in September 1931 and established the ex-Qing emperor Puyi as head of the puppet state of Manchukuo in 1932. The loss of Manchuria, and its potential for industrial development and war industries, was a blow to the Kuomintang economy. The League of Nations, established at the end of World War I, was unable to act in the face of Japanese defiance.

The Japanese began to push south of the Great Wall into northern China and the coastal provinces. Chinese fury against Japan was predictable, but anger was also directed against Chiang and the Nanking government, which at the time was more preoccupied with anti-Communist extermination campaigns than with resisting the Japanese invaders. The importance of "internal unity before external danger" was forcefully brought home in December 1936, when Chiang Kai-shek, in an event now known as the Xi'an Incident, was kidnapped by Zhang Xueliang and forced to ally with the Communists against the Japanese in the Second Kuomintang-CCP United Front.

Chinese resistance stiffened after 7 July 1937, when a clash occurred between Chinese and Japanese troops outside Beiping (Later Beijing) near the Marco Polo Bridge. This skirmish led to open, although undeclared, warfare between China and Japan. Shanghai fell after a three-month battle during which Japan suffered extensive casualties in both its army and navy. The capital, Nanking, fell in December 1937, which was followed by mass murders and rapes known as the Nanking Massacre. The national capital was briefly at Wuhan, then removed in an epic retreat to Chongqing, the seat of government until 1945. In 1940, the Japanese set up the collaborationist Wang Jingwei regime, with its capital in Nanking, which proclaimed itself the legitimate "Republic of China" in opposition to Chiang Kai-shek's government, although its claims were significantly hampered due to its being a puppet state controlling limited amounts of territory.

The United Front between the Kuomintang and the CCP had salutary effects for the beleaguered CCP, despite Japan's steady territorial gains in northern China, the coastal regions and the rich Yangtze River Valley in central China. After 1940, conflicts between the Kuomintang and Communists became more frequent in the areas not under Japanese control. The Communists expanded their influence wherever opportunities presented themselves through mass organizations, administrative reforms and the land- and tax-reform measures favoring the peasants and, the spread of their organizational network, while the Kuomintang attempted to neutralize the spread of Communist influence. Meanwhile, northern China was infiltrated politically by Japanese politicians in Manchukuo using facilities such as the Wei Huang Gong.

After its entry into the Pacific War during World War II, the United States became increasingly involved in Chinese affairs. As an ally, it embarked in late 1941 on a program of massive military and financial aid to the hard-pressed Nationalist Government. In January 1943, both the United States and the United Kingdom led the way in revising their unequal treaties with China from the past. Within a few months a new agreement was signed between the United States and the Republic of China for the stationing of American troops in China as part of the common war effort against Japan. The United States sought unsuccessfully to reconcile the rival Kuomintang and Communists, to make for a more effective anti-Japanese war effort. In December 1943, the Chinese Exclusion Acts of the 1880s, and subsequent laws, enacted by the United States Congress to restrict Chinese immigration into the United States were repealed. The wartime policy of the United States was meant to help China become a strong ally and a stabilizing force in postwar East Asia. During the war, China was one of the Big Four Allies of World War II and later one of the Four Policemen, which was a precursor to China having a permanent seat on the United Nations Security Council.

In August 1945, with American help, Nationalist troops moved to take the Japanese surrender in North China. The Soviet Union—encouraged to invade Manchuria to hasten the end of the war and allowed a Soviet sphere of influence there as agreed to at the Yalta Conference in February 1945—dismantled and removed more than half the industrial equipment left there by the Japanese. Although the Chinese had not been present at Yalta, they had been consulted and had agreed to have the Soviets enter the war, in the belief that the Soviet Union would deal only with the Kuomintang government. However, the Soviet presence in northeast China enabled the Communists to arm themselves with equipment surrendered by the withdrawing Japanese army.

1945–1949: Defeat in the Chinese Civil War

In 1945, after the end of the war, the Nationalist Government moved back to Nanjing. The Republic of China emerged from the war nominally a great military power but actually a nation economically prostrate and on the verge of all-out civil war. The problems of rehabilitating the formerly Japanese-occupied areas and of reconstructing the nation from the ravages of a protracted war were staggering. The economy deteriorated, sapped by the military demands of foreign war and internal strife, by spiraling inflation, and by Nationalist profiteering, speculation, and hoarding. Starvation came in the wake of the war, and millions were rendered homeless by floods and unsettled conditions in many parts of the country.

On 25 October 1945, following the Surrender of Japan, the administration of Taiwan and Penghu Islands were handed over from Japan to China. After the end of the war, United States Marines were used to hold Beiping (Beijing) and Tianjin against a possible Soviet incursion, and logistic support was given to Kuomintang forces in north and northeast China. To further this end, on 30 September 1945 the 1st Marine Division, charged with maintaining security in the areas of the Shandong Peninsula and the eastern Hebei, arrived in China.

In January 1946, through the mediation of the United States, a military truce between the Kuomintang and the Communists was arranged, but battles soon resumed. Public opinion of the administrative incompetence of the Nationalist government was incited by the Communists during the nationwide student protest against the mishandling of the Shen Chong rape case in early 1947 and during another national protest against monetary reforms later that year. The United States—realizing that no American efforts short of large-scale armed intervention could stop the coming war—withdrew Gen. George Marshall's American mission. Thereafter, the Chinese Civil War became more widespread; battles raged not only for territories but also for the allegiance of sections of the population. The United States aided the Nationalists with massive economic loans and weapons but no combat support.

Belatedly, the Republic of China government sought to enlist popular support through internal reforms. However, the effort was in vain, because of rampant government corruption and the accompanying political and economic chaos. By late 1948 the Kuomintang position was bleak. The demoralized and undisciplined National Revolutionary Army proved to be no match for the Communists' motivated and disciplined People's Liberation Army. The Communists were well established in the north and northeast. Although the Kuomintang had an advantage in numbers of men and weapons, controlled a much larger territory and population than their adversaries, and enjoyed considerable international support, they were exhausted by the long war with Japan and in-fighting among various generals. They were also losing the propaganda war to the Communists, with a population weary of Kuomintang corruption and yearning for peace.

In January 1949, Beiping was taken by the Communists without a fight, and its name changed back to Beijing. Following the capture of Nanjing on 23 April, major cities passed from Kuomintang to Communist control with minimal resistance, through November. In most cases the surrounding countryside and small towns had come under Communist influence long before the cities. Finally, on 1 October 1949, Communists led by Mao Zedong founded the People's Republic of China. Chiang Kai-shek declared martial law in May 1949, whilst a few hundred thousand Nationalist troops and two million refugees, predominantly from the government and business community, fled from mainland China to Taiwan. There remained in China itself only isolated pockets of resistance. On 7 December 1949, Chiang proclaimed Taipei, Taiwan, the temporary capital of the Republic of China.

During the Chinese Civil War both the Nationalists and Communists carried out mass atrocities, with millions of non-combatants killed by both sides. Benjamin Valentino has estimated atrocities in the civil war resulted in the death of between 1.8 million and 3.5 million people between 1927 and 1949, including deaths from forced conscription and massacres.

Government

The first Republic of China national government was established on 1 January 1912, in Nanjing, and was founded on the Constitution of the ROC and its Three Principles of the People, which state that "[the ROC] shall be a democratic republic of the people, to be governed by the people and for the people."

Sun Yat-sen was the provisional president. Delegates from the provinces sent to confirm the government's authority formed the first parliament in 1913. The power of this government was limited, with generals controlling both the central and northern provinces of China, and short-lived. The number of acts passed by the government was few and included the formal abdication of the Qing dynasty and some economic initiatives. The parliament's authority soon became nominal: violations of the Constitution by Yuan were met with half-hearted motions of censure. Kuomintang members of parliament who gave up their membership in the KMT were offered 1,000 pounds. Yuan maintained power locally by sending generals to be provincial governors or by obtaining the allegiance of those already in power.

When Yuan died, the parliament of 1913 was reconvened to give legitimacy to a new government. However, the real power passed to military leaders, leading to the warlord period. The impotent government still had its use; when World War I began, several Western powers and Japan wanted China to declare war on Germany, to liquidate German holdings in China.

In February 1928, the Fourth Plenary Session of the 2nd Kuomintang National Congress, held in Nanjing, passed the Reorganization of the Nationalist Government Act. This act stipulated that the Nationalist Government was to be directed and regulated under the Central Executive Committee of the Kuomintang, with the Committee of the Nationalist Government being elected by the KMT Central Committee. Under the Nationalist Government were seven ministries—Interior, Foreign Affairs, Finance, Transport, Justice, Agriculture and Mines, and Commerce, in addition to institutions such as the Supreme Court, Control Yuan, and the General Academy.

With the promulgation of the Organic Law of the Nationalist Government in October 1928, the government was reorganized into five different branches, or yuan, namely the Executive Yuan, Legislative Yuan, Judicial Yuan, Examination Yuan as well as the Control Yuan. The Chairman of the National Government was to be the head-of-state and commander-in-chief of the National Revolutionary Army. Chiang Kai-shek was appointed as the first chairman, a position he would retain until 1931. The Organic Law also stipulated that the Kuomintang, through its National Congress and Central Executive Committee, would exercise sovereign power during the period of "political tutelage", that the KMT's Political Council would guide and superintend the Nationalist Government in the execution of important national affairs, and that the Political Council has the power to interpret or amend the Organic Law.

Shortly after the Second Sino-Japanese War, a long-delayed constitutional convention was summoned to meet in Nanking in May 1946. Amidst heated debate, this convention adopted many constitutional amendments demanded by several parties, including the KMT and the Communist Party, into the Constitution. This Constitution was promulgated on 25 December 1946 and came into effect on 25 December 1947. Under it, the Central Government was divided into the presidency and the five yuans, each responsible for a part of the government. None was responsible to the other except for certain obligations such as the president appointing the head of the Executive Yuan. Ultimately, the president and the yuans reported to the National Assembly, which represented the will of the citizens.

Under the new constitution the first elections for the National Assembly occurred in January 1948, and the assembly was summoned to meet in March 1948. It elected the president of the republic on 21 March 1948, formally bringing an end to the KMT party rule started in 1928, although the president was a member of the KMT. These elections, though praised by at least one US observer, were poorly received by the Communist Party, which would soon start an open, armed insurrection.

Foreign relations

Before the Nationalist government was ousted from the mainland, the Republic of China had diplomatic relations with 59 countries, including Australia, Canada, Cuba, Czechoslovakia, Estonia, France, Germany, Guatemala, Honduras, Italy, Japan, Latvia, Lithuania, Norway, Panama, Siam, the Soviet Union, Spain, the United Kingdom, the United States, and the Holy See. The Republic of China was able to maintain most of these diplomatic ties, at least initially following the retreat to Taiwan. Chiang Kai-shek had vowed to quickly return and "liberate" the mainland, an assurance that became a cornerstone of the ROC's post 1949 foreign policy.

Under the Atlantic Charter, the Republic of China was entitled to a permanent seat on the UN Security Council (UNSC). Though multiple objections were raised that the seat belonged to the lawful government of China, which had to many become the PRC even arguably prior to the official conclusion of the Chinese Civil War, the ROC retained the permanent seat reserved for China on the UNSC until 1971 when it was supplanted by the PRC.

Administrative divisions

Nobility

The Republic of China retained hereditary nobility like the Han Chinese nobles Duke Yansheng and Celestial Masters and Tusi chiefdoms like the Chiefdom of Mangshi, Chiefdom of Yongning, who continued possessing their titles in the Republic of China from the previous dynasties.

Military

The military power of the Republic of China was inherited from the New Army, mainly the Beiyang Army, which later split into many factions and attacked each other. The National Revolutionary Army was established by Sun Yat-sen in 1925 in Guangdong with the goal of reunifying China under the Kuomintang. Originally organized with Soviet aid as a means for the KMT to unify China against warlordism, the National Revolutionary Army fought many major engagements: in the Northern Expedition against Beiyang Army warlords, in the Second Sino-Japanese War against the Imperial Japanese Army, and in the Chinese Civil War against the People's Liberation Army.

During the Second Sino-Japanese War, the armed forces of the CCP were nominally incorporated into the National Revolutionary Army, while remaining under separate command, but broke away to form the People's Liberation Army shortly after the end of the war. With the promulgation of the Constitution of the Republic of China in 1947 and the formal end of the KMT party-state, the National Revolutionary Army was renamed the Republic of China Armed Forces, with the bulk of its forces forming the Republic of China Army, which retreated to Taiwan in 1949 after their defeat in the Chinese Civil War. Units which surrendered and remained in mainland China were either disbanded or incorporated into the People's Liberation Army.

Economy

In the early years of the Republic of China, the economy remained unstable as the country was marked by constant warfare between different regional warlord factions. The Beiyang government in Beijing experienced constant changes in leadership, and this political instability led to stagnation in economic development until Chinese reunification in 1928 under the Kuomintang. After this reunification, China entered a period of relative stability—despite ongoing isolated military conflicts and in the face of Japanese aggression in Shandong and Manchuria, in 1931—a period known as the "Nanjing Decade".

Chinese industries grew considerably from 1928 to 1931. While the economy was hit by the Japanese occupation of Manchuria in 1931 and the Great Depression from 1931 to 1935, industrial output recovered to their earlier peak by 1936. This is reflected by the trends in Chinese GDP. In 1932, China's GDP peaked at 28.8 billion, before falling to 21.3 billion by 1934 and recovering to 23.7 billion by 1935. By 1930, foreign investment in China totaled 3.5 billion, with Japan leading (1.4 billion) followed by the United Kingdom (1 billion). By 1948, however, the capital investment had halted and dropped to only 3 billion, with the US and Britain being the leading investors.

However, the rural economy was hit hard by the Great Depression of the 1930s, in which an overproduction of agricultural goods lead to falling prices for China as well as an increase in foreign imports (as agricultural goods produced in western countries were "dumped" in China). In 1931, Chinese imports of rice amounted to 21 million bushels compared with 12 million in 1928. Other imports saw even more increases. In 1932, 15 million bushels of grain were imported compared with 900,000 in 1928. This increased competition lead to a massive decline in Chinese agricultural prices and thus the income of rural farmers. In 1932, agricultural prices were at 41 percent of 1921 levels. By 1934, rural incomes had fallen to 57 percent of 1931 levels in some areas.

In 1937, Japan invaded China and the resulting warfare laid waste to China. Most of the prosperous east coast was occupied by the Japanese, who committed atrocities such as the Nanjing massacre. In one anti-guerilla sweep in 1942, the Japanese killed up to 200,000 civilians in a month. The war was estimated to have killed between 20 and 25 million Chinese, and destroyed all that Chiang had built up in the preceding decade. Development of industries was severely hampered after the war by devastating civil conflict as well as the inflow of cheap American goods. By 1946, Chinese industries operated at 20% capacity and had 25% of the output of pre-war China.

One effect of the war with Japan was a massive increase in government control of industries. In 1936, government-owned industries were only 15% of GDP. However, the ROC government took control of many industries to fight the war. In 1938, the ROC established a commission for industries and mines to supervise and control firms, as well as instilling price controls. By 1942, 70% of Chinese industry was owned by the government.

Following the surrender of Japan in World War II, Japanese Taiwan was placed under the control of the ROC. In the meantime, the KMT renewed its struggle with the communists. However, the corruption and hyperinflation as a result of trying to fight the civil war, resulted in mass unrest throughout the Republic and sympathy for the communists. In addition, the communists' promise to redistribute land gained them support among the large rural population. In 1949, the communists captured Beijing and later Nanjing. The People's Republic of China was proclaimed on 1 October 1949. The Republic of China relocated to Taiwan where Japan had laid an educational groundwork.

See also

 China–Soviet Union relations
 Economic history of China (1912–1949)
 History of China–United States relations to 1948
 Project National Glory
 Sino-German cooperation (1926–1941)

Notes

References

Citations

Sources
 For works on specific people and events, please see the relevant articles.

 Boorman, Howard, et al., eds.,Biographical Dictionary of Republican China. (New York: Columbia University Press, 4 vols, 1967–1971). 600 articles. Available online at Internet Archive.
 
 
 
 . In the series "Inventing the Nation."
 
 Jowett, Philip. (2013) China's Wars: Rousing the Dragon 1894–1949 (Bloomsbury Publishing, 2013).
 Leung, Edwin Pak-wah. Historical Dictionary of Revolutionary China, 1839–1976 (1992) online free to borrow
 Leung, Edwin Pak-wah.  Political Leaders of Modern China: A Biographical Dictionary (2002)
 Li, Xiaobing. (2007) A History of the Modern Chinese Army excerpt
 Li, Xiaobing. (2012) China at War: An Encyclopedia excerpt
 
 
 
 
 Vogel, Ezra F. China and Japan: Facing History (2019)  excerpt
 Westad, Odd Arne. Restless Empire: China and the World since 1750 (2012) Online free to borrow
 Wilbur, Clarence Martin. Sun Yat-sen, frustrated patriot (Columbia University Press, 1976), a major scholarly biography online

 Historiography

 Yu, George T. "The 1911 Revolution: Past, Present, and Future," Asian Survey, 31#10 (1991), pp. 895–904, online historiography

External links 
 
 

 
1912 establishments in China
1949 disestablishments in China

States and territories established in 1912
States and territories disestablished in 1949
Former republics
Former member states of the United Nations